Dakshinkali is a municipality in Kathmandu District in the Province No. 3 of Nepal that was established on 2 December 2014 by merging the former Village development committees Chalnakhel, Chhaimale, Sheshnarayan, Sokhel, Talku Dudechaur and Old-Dakshinkali. The municipality's name means 'Southern Kali' and refers to a several centuries old temple complex that lies in the vicinity.

Population
Dakshinkali municipality has a total population of 24,297 according to 2011 Nepal census.

See also
Dakshinkali Temple

References

External links
Dakshinkali

Populated places in Kathmandu District